Singapore Airlines Flight 117 was a Singapore Airlines flight that was hijacked en route by four Pakistani terrorists on 26 March 1991. 

The aircraft landed in Singapore. The hijackers, who claimed to be members of the Pakistan Peoples Party (PPP), demanded the release of former Prime Minister of Pakistan Benazir Bhutto's husband, Asif Ali Zardari, who later became President of Pakistan, as well as other PPP members from jail. 

As their demands were not being met, the hijackers threatened to begin killing the hostages; before their deadline expired, commandos from the Special Operations Force (SOF) stormed the plane, killing the hijackers and freeing all hostages unhurt. This was the first and only hijacking involving a Singapore Airlines aircraft.

Timeline

The plane, an Airbus A310 with registration 9V-STP, had taken off from Sultan Abdul Aziz Shah Airport in Subang near Kuala Lumpur, Malaysia at 21:15 SST, with 114 passengers and 11 crew on board. The plane was hijacked in mid-air while en route to Singapore Changi Airport by four Pakistanis. The hijackers were armed with explosives and knives but no firearms. It landed safely at Changi Airport at 22:15, where a group of officials from the Ministry of Defence, Ministry of Home Affairs and Ministry of Information, Communications and the Arts, along with Singapore Airlines representatives and a negotiating team, were waiting.

The hijackers, who claimed to be members of the Pakistan Peoples Party (PPP), demanded the release of former Prime Minister of Pakistan Benazir Bhutto's husband, Asif Ali Zardari (later elected President of Pakistan), as well as other PPP members from jail. The hijackers also required the plane to be refuelled to fly to Australia. The next morning, 27 March, at 02:30, the hijackers pushed two (male) flight attendants, flight steward Bernard Tan and chief steward Philip Cheong, out of the aircraft, after the plane had been moved to the outer tarmac.

At 06:45, the hijackers gave a last 5-minute deadline, and issued a threat to kill one passenger every ten minutes if their demands were still not met. With three minutes to go, orders were given to initiate the assault: the Singapore Armed Forces Commando Formation (SAF CDO FN) stormed the plane in a 30-second sweep, killing all four hijackers with no injuries to hostages. The hijack leader had been shot five times in the chest, but was still alive. He then attempted to stand and ignite his explosive but a commando shot him dead before he did so. The plane was completely secured by 06:50.

Aftermath
Singapore received international praise for its prompt action in handling the incident. Then Prime Minister of Singapore Goh Chok Tong commended all those involved in handling the ordeal and rescue mission for their swiftness and efficiency. Captain Stanley Lim, the pilot of the flight, and Superintendent Foo Kia Juah, chief police negotiator, were awarded the Public Service Star for their roles. The SAF Commando Formation members were awarded the Medal for Valour, and others in the negotiating team were given the President's Certificates of Commendation.

Singapore Airlines as of 15 July 2020 continues to operate the flight number 117 between Kuala Lumpur and Singapore, using an Airbus A350-900 (Flight 117 used to operate A330-300 on this route) except on Saturdays and Sundays.

The aircraft
The hijacked aircraft had been delivered to Singapore Airlines on 22 November 1988. The hijacked plane continued to remain in daily service with Singapore Airlines after the incident for the next 10 years, until it was transferred to Spanish airline Air Plus Comet on 11 May 2001. The plane was painted all-white and re-registered from 9V-STP to EC-HVB. On 31 May 2003, it was retired from flying and was stored in the Mojave Air and Space Port in the United States. On 25 April 2005, the untitled A310 aircraft which was registered N443RR was broken up and scrapped.

See also

Air France Flight 8969 – similar incident and resolution in 1994
Indian Airlines Flight 814 – similar incident in 1999

References

External links

Terrorist incidents in Singapore
1991 crimes in Singapore
Aircraft hijackings
117
Aviation accidents and incidents in 1991
Terrorist incidents in Asia in 1991
Military history of Singapore
Aviation accidents and incidents in Singapore
Accidents and incidents involving the Airbus A310
Pakistan–Singapore relations
March 1991 events in Asia
1991 disasters in Singapore